Popplio, known as  in Japan, is a Pokémon species in Nintendo and Game Freak's Pokémon franchise. Popplio is referred to as the "Sea Lion Pokémon" and was introduced as a starter Pokémon in the 2016 video games Pokémon Sun and Moon. Popplio is a Water-type pinniped Pokémon that is primarily blue. Popplio received generally negative responses from critics, with criticism directed towards its appearance as a starter Pokémon in Pokémon Sun and Moon.

Concept and design
Popplio are sea lion Pokémon that can do tricks and form water bubbles from their "clown-like nose". Popplio is a Water-type pinniped Pokémon that has large eyes, a long, white snout with black whiskers and a round, pink nose. There is a small, rounded earflap on each side of its head. Around its neck is a light blue ruff, which extends past its shoulders. It has four flippers. The front flippers are larger than the hind and have white markings separating its toes. Popplio is able to snort bubbles of water from its nose, which it uses as part of its battle strategy. On land, it uses the elasticity of its bubbles to perform acrobatic stunts and jumps. It evolves into Brionne, which later evolves into Primarina.

Appearances
Popplio originally appeared in Pokémon Sun and Moon as a starter Pokémon. It later appeared in Pokémon Ultra Sun and Ultra Moon and Pokémon Sword and Shield.

Aside from the main series, It also appeared in Pokémon Rumble Rush, Pokémon Shuffle, Pokémon Masters EX, Pokkén Tournament and New Pokémon Snap.

In other media
In the anime,  Lana, a protagonist in the Pokémon the Series: Sun & Moon, owned a Popplio as her main Pokémon. Lana's Popplio evolved fully into a Primarina in the series.

In the Pokémon Adventures manga,  Popplio made its debut in "The Delivery of Rotom and the Girl" chapter of Pokémon Adventures. It was owned by Professor Kukui and later evolved fully into Primarina.

Reception
In contrast to the positive reactions to Rowlet and Litten, Popplio initially received negative reactions across social media platforms, however, these reactions have generally become more neutral or positive over time, leading many to see Popplio as a polarizing addition. A 2016 community poll by Destructoid ranked Popplio as the least popular Pokémon starter. In a Twitter poll held by The Pokémon Company International, Popplio was the least popular of the three starters, receiving only 21 percent of the vote. As a result, supporters of Popplio began to defend the Pokémon. According to Christian Hoffer, "the sea lion has been subjected to so much derision...Popplio's few fans have even formed a 'Popplio Defense Squad' dedicated to sending out positive vibes for the disparaged Pokemon". Kotaku reported that "While most Pokémon fans were freaking out about Litten's perfect name, or Rowlet's cute bowtie, Popplio seemed to either attract indifference, hate, or worse, straight-up pity". Some fans referred to Popplio as "ugly", and its evolution, Brionne, received further criticism for being "too 'feminine.

In response to the criticisms, Pokémon Sun and Moon director Shigeru Ohmori stated that "I personally think that Popplio was very cute and he'll be very popular with a lot of people." During the voting of Polygon staff on which is the best Pokémon starter of Pokémon Sun and Pokémon Moon, none of them voted Popplio. Ashely Oh described Popplio as a "shitty, nominal derivative of Piplup", later stating that "Popplio has a lot of things wrong with it, but maybe it's not Popplio's fault that Popplio looks like a secondhand child clown." Megan Farokhmanesh of The Verge described Popplio as "very ugly" and further stated that his "big dumb nose is so honkable, front flippers are too big, and the back flippers are too small. His ears don't even make sense. Is he a dog or a seal?" Allega Prank praised Popplio's final evolution and called it "pretty". Sam Loveridge of Digital Spy claimed that due to the hatred of Popplio, the Pokémon Sun and Moon creators even don't like Popplio. Daniel Dockery of Syfy ranked Popplio as 20th of 23 starter Pokémon, though he also described "It's adorable." Laura Gray of Screen Rant called Popplio "pretty cute". Paste Magazine gave a positive review of Popplio while comparing it with Mimikyu. Nintendo World Report noted the type advantages it enjoys in Pokémon Sun and Moon. On July 16, 2016, Trickywi, a popular PokeTuber who adores Popplio, released the video for "In Your Spotlight", a song she composed in response to the online hatred and criticisms.

References

External links
 Popplio on Bulbapedia
 Popplio on Pokemon.com

Pokémon species
Video game characters introduced in 2016
Fictional pinnipeds
Video game characters with water abilities
Fictional circus performers
Video game memes
Video game characters who use magic